Dekai is a town in the province of Highland Papua, Indonesia, and the actual administrative center of Yahukimo Regency. The official administrative center of Yahukimo Regency is Sumohai. Sumohai is located 25 kilometers north of Dekai, and due to the lack of infrastructure in Sumohai, the administrative center of Yahukimo Regency is in Dekai. In the 2010 census, Dekai's Suma District had a total of 3,419 people.

The town is located on the Bulaza River and the Dykno Puglia Airport is located in the northwest of the town.

Transportation 
The town has its own airport Nop Goliat Dekai Airport.

Climate
Dekai has a tropical rainforest climate (Af) with heavy to very heavy rainfall year-round.

References 

Populated places in Highland Papua
Districts of Highland Papua
Regency seats of Highland Papua